An excessive heat watch is a notice issued by the National Weather Service of the United States when the heat index is expected to be greater than 105 °F (41 °C) across the northern states or 110 °F (43 °C) across the southern states during the day, and/or nighttime low temperature will be at least 75 °F (24 °C) or higher for two consecutive days.  Note that even with the usual northern/southern criteria, local offices, particularly those with deserts or mountainous terrain, often have their own criteria. High values of the heat index are caused by temperatures being significantly above normal and high humidities, and such high levels can pose a threat to human life through conditions such as heat stroke.

Example
The following is an example of an excessive heat watch issued by the National Weather Service office in Memphis, Tennessee.

789 
WWUS74 KMEG 130142
NPWMEG

URGENT - WEATHER MESSAGE
NATIONAL WEATHER SERVICE MEMPHIS TN
842 PM CDT MON JUL 12 2010

...VERY HOT AND HUMID CONDITIONS POSSIBLE WEDNESDAY THROUGH
THURSDAY...

.A LARGE...HOT RIDGE OF HIGH PRESSURE WILL BUILD OVER THE LOWER
MISSISSIPPI RIVER VALLEY DURING THE MIDDLE OF THE WEEK. HOT
TEMPERATURES IN COMBINATION WITH A VERY HUMID AIRMASS LEFT IN
PLACE BY RECENT HEAVY RAINS WILL BRING THE MOST STIFLING AIRMASS
TO PORTIONS OF THE MIDSOUTH SO FAR THIS SUMMER.

ARZ008-009-017-018-026>028-035-036-048-049-058-MOZ113-115-MSZ001-
002-007-008-010>013-020-021-TNZ001-002-019-048>051-088-089-130945-
/O.NEW.KMEG.EH.A.0001.100714T1500Z-100716T0300Z/
RANDOLPH-CLAY-LAWRENCE-GREENE-CRAIGHEAD-POINSETT-MISSISSIPPI-
CROSS-CRITTENDEN-ST. FRANCIS-LEE AR-PHILLIPS-DUNKLIN-PEMISCOT-
DESOTO-MARSHALL-TUNICA-TATE-COAHOMA-QUITMAN-PANOLA-LAFAYETTE-
TALLAHATCHIE-YALOBUSHA-LAKE-OBION-DYER-LAUDERDALE-TIPTON-HAYWOOD-
CROCKETT-SHELBY-FAYETTE-
INCLUDING THE CITIES OF...WALNUT RIDGE...PARAGOULD...JONESBORO...
HARRISBURG...BLYTHEVILLE...WYNNE...WEST MEMPHIS...FORREST CITY...
HELENA...KENNETT...CARUTHERSVILLE...SOUTHAVEN...OLIVE BRANCH...
TUNICA...CLARKSDALE...BATESVILLE...OXFORD...UNION CITY...
DYERSBURG...COVINGTON...BARTLETT...GERMANTOWN...COLLIERVILLE...
MEMPHIS...MILLINGTON...SOMERVILLE
842 PM CDT MON JUL 12 2010

...EXCESSIVE HEAT WATCH IN EFFECT FROM WEDNESDAY MORNING THROUGH
THURSDAY EVENING...

THE NATIONAL WEATHER SERVICE IN MEMPHIS HAS ISSUED AN EXCESSIVE
HEAT WATCH...WHICH IS IN EFFECT FROM WEDNESDAY MORNING THROUGH
THURSDAY EVENING.

* HEAT INDEX READINGS OF 107 TO 112 DEGREES WILL RESULT FROM
  DAYTIME TEMPERATURES IN THE MID TO UPPER 90S AND DEW POINTS IN
  THE MID TO UPPER 70S. LITTLE RELIEF CAN BE EXPECTED WEDNESDAY
  NIGHT WITH LOWS REMAINING ABOVE 75 DEGREES...AND POSSIBLY 80
  DEGREES IN DOWNTOWN MEMPHIS.

* THE HIGHEST HEAT INDEX READINGS WILL BE FELT BETWEEN 1 PM AND 6
  PM WEDNESDAY AND THURSDAY AFTERNOONS.

* HEAT INDEX READINGS AROUND 110 DEGREES CAN BE A VERY DANGEROUS
  SITUATION IF PRECAUTIONS ARE NOT TAKEN. HEAT IS THE NUMBER ONE
  WEATHER KILLER. HEAT RELATED ILLNESSES ARE LIKELY IN THESE
  CONDITIONS FOR ALL PEOPLE WITH PROLONGED EXPOSURE TO THE HEAT.
  YOUNG CHILDREN...ELDERLY PEOPLE...THOSE WITH ILLNESSES OR HEART
  CONDITIONS...AND THOSE WHO WORK OUTDOORS ARE ESPECIALLY AT RISK.

PRECAUTIONARY/PREPAREDNESS ACTIONS...

AN EXCESSIVE HEAT WATCH MEANS THAT A PROLONGED PERIOD OF HOT
TEMPERATURES IS EXPECTED. THE COMBINATION OF HOT TEMPERATURES AND
HIGH HUMIDITY WILL COMBINE TO CREATE A DANGEROUS SITUATION IN
WHICH HEAT ILLNESSES ARE POSSIBLE. DRINK PLENTY OF FLUIDS...STAY
IN AN AIR-CONDITIONED ROOM...STAY OUT OF THE SUN...AND CHECK UP
ON RELATIVES AND NEIGHBORS.

&&

$$

BORGHOFF

See also
 Severe weather terminology (United States)

References

External links
 National Weather Service

Weather warnings and advisories